Dame Nia Rhiannon Griffith  (born 4 December 1956) is a Welsh politician who has served as Member of Parliament (MP) for Llanelli since 2005. A member of the Labour Party, she has been a Shadow Minister for International Trade since 2021. Griffith served as Shadow Secretary of State for Defence from 2016 to 2020, and Shadow Secretary of State for Wales from 2015 to 2016 and 2020 to 2021.

Early life and career
Griffith was born in Dublin, Republic of Ireland, on 4 December 1956.

She was educated at Newland High School for Girls (now called Newland School for Girls) in Hull and Somerville College, Oxford where she graduated with a first class degree in modern languages in 1979.

Griffith was a founder member of a local Women's Aid organisation and is a member of the National Union of Teachers and the Union of Shop, Distributive and Allied Workers.

Parliamentary career
She was selected to contest the Welsh seat of Llanelli for Labour at the 2005 General Election following the imposition of an all-women shortlist after the retirement of Denzil Davies. She won the seat with a majority of 7,234 votes and remains the MP there. Griffith made her maiden speech on 19 May 2005.

Griffith was re-elected in 2010 with her majority reduced by 2,533 votes. In October 2010, she became Shadow Minister for Business, Innovation and Skills until October 2011 when she became Shadow Minister for Wales. On 13 September 2015 she became Shadow Secretary of State for Wales. She resigned from this position on 27 June 2016 following a series of other resignations from Jeremy Corbyn's Shadow Cabinet, but was appointed Shadow Defence Secretary four months later. She supported Owen Smith in the failed attempt to replace Jeremy Corbyn in the 2016 Labour Party (UK) leadership election.

Griffith is a member of Labour Friends of Israel.

Griffith held her seat at the 2019 general election. She was appointed by Keir Starmer to serve as Shadow Secretary of State for Wales on 6 April 2020. On 29 November 2021 she was replaced by Jo Stevens in a shadow cabinet reshuffle. She announced her new role of Shadow Minister of State for International Trade on 4 December 2021.

She was appointed Dame Commander of the Order of the British Empire (DBE) in the 2022 Birthday Honours for political and public service.

Expenses
In June 2009, Griffith was named as one of the Welsh MPs whose expenses had been overpaid. Following a review of expenses Sir Thomas Legg ordered Griffith to repay £4,099.77 in mortgage interest claims.

In June 2010, Griffith had to repay the cost of sending 71 letters having been found to have breached Parliamentary rules on using House of Commons stationery for political purposes. The Department of Resources ruled that the letters, sent out just before the general election, "sought to communicate information about the Labour Party and that its intention was to persuade constituents to vote accordingly for the sitting party member". Griffith also apologised for her actions.

Personal life
Griffith is divorced, her former husband was a social worker. In a photo shoot for The Independent in February 2016, Griffith came out as a lesbian, commenting that her sexuality had been known among friends, family and colleagues since the mid-1990s. She was named on the 2017 Pink List of leading Welsh LGBT figures.

Griffith owns a house in Llanelli, a flat in London, and a smallholding in Carmarthenshire which received Tir Gofal funding. Her hobbies include music, European cinema, gardening, walking and cycling. She is an honorary associate of the National Secular Society.

Publication
 100 Ideas for Teaching Languages by Nia Griffith, 2005, Continuum International Publishing Group

References

External links
 Nia Griffith MP official constituency website
Nia Griffith MP Welsh Labour Party profile

 All Party Parliamentary Group on Modern Languages

|-

|-

1956 births
Living people
21st-century British women politicians
Alumni of Somerville College, Oxford
Alumni of Bangor University
Councillors in Wales
Welsh Labour Party MPs
Female members of the Parliament of the United Kingdom for Welsh constituencies
LGBT members of the Parliament of the United Kingdom
Welsh LGBT politicians
Welsh lesbians
Welsh people of Irish descent
Labour Friends of Israel
Members of the Parliament of the United Kingdom for Carmarthenshire constituencies
UK MPs 2005–2010
UK MPs 2010–2015
UK MPs 2015–2017
UK MPs 2017–2019
UK MPs 2019–present
Welsh-speaking politicians
Women councillors in Wales
Dames Commander of the Order of the British Empire
British republicans